Airport tax may refer to:

 Airport improvement fee, charged by some airports to fund expansion projects
 Landing fee, charged by most international airports per landed aircraft, and usually paid by the passengers as part of the price of the tickets